Michael R. Gardiner (born 22 March 1978) is a former Australian rules footballer who played with Collingwood in the Australian Football League (AFL).

Gardiner, a basketball player in his youth, was used as a tall forward and ruckman by Collingwood, who selected him in the 1997 Pre-Season Draft. He played in the final two rounds of the 1998 AFL season and appeared in five games the following year.

References

External links
 
 

1978 births
Australian rules footballers from Western Australia
Collingwood Football Club players
Subiaco Football Club players
Living people